Marko Bašić (born 13 September 1984) is a Croatian retired football player.

Club career
He has also played for NK Varteks in Croatia and Kastrioti Krujë in the Albanian Superliga. He last played profesionally for HNK Šibenik.

References

1984 births
Living people
Association football defenders
Croatian footballers
NK Varaždin players
HŠK Zrinjski Mostar players
KF Vllaznia Shkodër players
Flamurtari Vlorë players
KS Kastrioti players
HNK Šibenik players
Croatian Football League players
Premier League of Bosnia and Herzegovina players
Kategoria Superiore players
First Football League (Croatia) players
Croatian expatriate footballers
Expatriate footballers in Bosnia and Herzegovina
Croatian expatriate sportspeople in Bosnia and Herzegovina
Expatriate footballers in Albania
Croatian expatriate sportspeople in Albania